Cloudkicker is a post-rock/post-metal musical 
project based in Columbus, Ohio, created by guitarist Ben Sharp. Sharp, a commercial airline pilot, does not pursue Cloudkicker as a full-time project; he releases his music as "pay what you want" under the Creative Commons license through Bandcamp.

Sharp composes, records and engineers all his music by himself; while he originally intended a studio-only project due to his distaste for touring, Sharp performed a short tour in 2014 with Intronaut (who acted as his backing band) and Tesseract.

Discography

Albums 
 2005: myspace.com/musicistight (Compilation)
 2008: The Discovery
 2010: Beacons
 2011: Let Yourself Be Huge
 2011: Loop
 2012: Fade
 2013: Subsume
 2014: Live with Intronaut (Century Media)
 2015: Woum
 2019: Unending
 2020: Loop (2020)
 2020: Solitude

EPs & Singles 

 2008: The Map Is Not the Territory
 2009: Portmanteau
 2009: ]]][[[
 2010: A New Heavenly Body (]]][[[ remixed and remastered)
 2013: Hello
 2014: Little Histories

References

Heavy metal musical groups from Ohio